Delirium (also known as Psycho Puppet) is a 1979 American thriller film directed by Peter Maris and written by Maris and Richard Yalem. The film is one of the infamous "Video Nasties".

Cast 
 Turk Cekovsky as Paul Dollinger
 Debi Chaney as Susan Norcross
 Terry TenBroek as Larry Mead (as Terry Ten Broek)
 Barron Winchester as Eric Stem
 Bob Winters as Donald Andrews
 Garrett Bergfeld as Mark
 Nick Panouzis as Charlie Gunther
 Harry Gorsuch as Capt. Hearn
 Chris Chronopolis as Det. Parker
 Lloyd Schattyn as Det. Simms
 Jack Garvey as Devlin
 Mike Kalist as Specter
 Myron Kozman as Wells
 Pat Knapko as Jenny Thompson
 Letty Garris as Hitchhiker
 Charlotte Littrel as Vietnamese prostitute
 Richard L. Jones as grocery delivery boy.

Release 

Delirium was released in July 1979 in the United States.

Critical reception 

TV Guide's review was generally unfavourable, criticising the film's use of Vietnam War flashbacks to explain the killer's motivations.

References

External links 

 

1970s thriller films
1970s English-language films